St. Kieran's Church is a medieval church and National Monument located in Errill, County Laois, Ireland.

Location

St. Kieran's Church is located to the south of Errill village, about 5 km (3½ miles) to the west of Rathdowney, on the south bank of the Errill River (a tributary of the River Erkina, which itself feeds into the Nore).

History

The site at Errill dates back to the early Christian period where a monastery was founded by Saint Ciarán of Saigir (died c. AD 530). A holy tree and holy well associated with Kieran stand nearby. Only grass-covered wall footing remains of the monastery. The church was built later, in the medieval period. A wayside cross was constructed in the 17th century.

The building

Ruins consist of upstanding walls, measuring 16.9 m x 8.8 m. A doorway and rounded window remains in the south wall. Another window survives also. Masonry has been reused as gravemarkers in the graveyard.

References

Religious buildings and structures in County Laois
Archaeological sites in County Laois
National Monuments in County Laois